Atopos is a genus of carnivorous air-breathing land slugs, terrestrial pulmonate gastropod mollusks in the family Rathouisiidae.

Species 
Species within the genus Atopos include:
 Atopos aborense (Ghosh, 1913)
Atopos australis Heynemann, 1876
Atopos cristagalli P. Sarasin & F. Sarasin, 1899
Atopos galeatus Simroth, 1920
Atopos harmeri Collinge, 1902
 Atopos kempii Ghose, 1913
Atopos leuckarti Simroth, 1891
 Atopos laidlawi Collinge, 1902
 Atopos maximus Collinge 1903
 Atopos ouwensi Collinge, 1908
 Atopos prismatica Tapparone-Canefri, 1883
Atopos pristis P. Sarasin & F. Sarasin, 1899
 Atopos punctata Collinge, 1902
 Atopos rugosus Collinge, 1902
Atopos sanguinolentus Ghosh, 1912
 Atopos sarasini Collinge 1902
Atopos schildii Babor, 1900
Atopos scutulatus P. Sarasin & F. Sarasin, 1899
 Atopos semperi Simroth, 1891
Atopos simrothi P. Sarasin & F. Sarasin, 1899
Atopos smithi (Collinge, 1902)
Atopos strubelli Simroth, 1891
Atopos tourannensis (Eydoux & Souleyet, 1852)

Synonyms:
 Atopos leonina (Heude, 1882) is a synonym of Rathouisia leonina Heude, 1882

Distribution 
The predatory carnivorous slugs in the genus Atopos are found in peninsular Malaysia, Sumatra, Borneo, New Guinea, northeast Australia and, recently, Singapore.

Feeding habits

Bornean Atopos specialising in Opisthostoma are known to tailor their approach to the size of the prey. They hold small snails with the shells aperture-upward with the front of its foot and eat their way down. Larger ones scrape away the shell to allow access through the spire. This behaviour is thought to drive the evolution of shell ornamentation in Opisthostoma.

References

External links 

 photo of predating by Atopos (figure b)